West Hawk Lake is a impact crater lake on the Whiteshell River located in the Whiteshell Provincial Park in southeastern Manitoba, Canada. The circular shape of the main body of the lake is due to the submerged West Hawk crater, caused by a meteor impact into an ancient rock bed composed of mostly granite.  At , it is the deepest lake in Manitoba.

Granite cliffs surround parts of the lake.  This area is also known as part of the Canadian Shield that was formed billions of years ago.  Parts of the Whiteshell park have elaborate petroforms that were made by First Nation peoples, possibly over a thousand years ago.  There are petroform shapes of turtles, snakes, humans and geometrical patterns, often found upon pink granite ridges that were shaped during the last ice age.

A marine glacial relict, the Deepwater sculpin is found in West Hawk Lake.

The lake has private cottages, public beaches, campgrounds and other tourism amenities, and extensive undeveloped shoreline, and is popular for boating, sailing, Wakeboarding and scuba diving. It is just north of the Trans-Canada Highway, and on the Trans Canada Trail, on the border of Manitoba and Ontario.

References

 STOP #5: West Hawk Lake Impact Crater (field trip note)
 Archived link

External links

Lakes of Manitoba
Whiteshell Provincial Park
Impact crater lakes
Bodies of water of Eastman Region, Manitoba